Odafe Jayson Oweh (born December 15, 1998), is an American football outside linebacker for the Baltimore Ravens of the National Football League (NFL). He played college football at Penn State and was drafted by the Ravens in the first round of the 2021 NFL Draft.

Early years
Of Nigerian descent, Oweh was born in Hackensack, New Jersey, on December 15, 1998, and attended Blair Academy in Blairstown, New Jersey. He was selected to play in the 2018 Under Armour All-America Game. Oweh committed to Penn State to play college football.

College career
As a true freshman at Penn State in 2018, Oweh played in four games and had two sacks. As a sophomore in 2019, he played in 13 games with one start and had 21 tackles and five sacks. He recorded 38 tackles, including six tackles for a loss, in the 2020 season.

Professional career

Baltimore Ravens
Oweh was selected by the Baltimore Ravens in the first round (31st overall) of the 2021 NFL Draft, which they previously obtained in a trade that sent Orlando Brown Jr. to the Kansas City Chiefs. Soon after the draft, Oweh announced that he would be going by his first name Odafe instead of his middle name Jayson, which he went by in college to avoid confusion regarding the pronunciation of his first name. He signed his four-year rookie contract, worth $12.6 million, on June 10, 2021.

2021 season
Oweh got his first career forced fumble and recovery late in the fourth quarter against Clyde Edwards-Helaire and the Kansas City Chiefs, his second career game. The turnover helped seal a 36–35 victory. He was named the defensive player of the week for his performance, which included three tackles, a tackle for loss, a forced fumble, and a fumble recovery. He also had a quarterback hit on Patrick Mahomes that led to an interception by his teammate Tavon Young. He would not play the final two weeks of the season due to injury, becoming just one of the many Ravens players that would be injured that season. Oweh finished his rookie season with 33 total tackles, 5 sacks, 3 forced fumbles, 2 fumble recoveries, and a pass breakup.

2022 season
In Week 4 against the Buffalo Bills, he forced a fumble that was recovered by fellow teammate Marcus Williams and also had a sack on Josh Allen. However, the Ravens would lose 20–23.

References

External links
Penn State Nittany Lions bio
Baltimore Ravens bio

1998 births
Living people
Blair Academy alumni
Sportspeople from Hackensack, New Jersey
Players of American football from New Jersey
American football defensive ends
Penn State Nittany Lions football players
Baltimore Ravens players
American sportspeople of Nigerian descent